BS28 may refer to:
BS28, a BS postcode area for Bristol, England
Bonomi BS.28 Alcione and B.28 Aerodinamico, gliders
BS 28 Report on Nuts, Bolt Heads and Spanners, a British Standard